Evan Mobley (born June 18, 2001) is an American professional basketball player for the Cleveland Cavaliers of the National Basketball Association (NBA). He played college basketball for the USC Trojans and was selected third overall by the Cleveland Cavaliers in the 2021 NBA draft.

Early life and high school career
Mobley, along with his older brother, Isaiah, began playing basketball from an early age under the guidance of their father, Eric, a former basketball player. Evan was initially reluctant to play basketball but became more interested in the sport in eighth grade, when he stood 6'4. Mobley began playing high school basketball as a freshman at Rancho Christian School in Temecula, California. In his first three years, he was teammates with Isaiah, a five-star recruit in the 2019 class. 

As a junior at Rancho Christian, Mobley averaged 19.2 points, 10.4 rebounds, and 4.7 blocks per game. He was named California Gatorade Player of the Year and The Press-Enterprise player of the year. In his senior season, Mobley averaged 20.5 points, 12.2 rebounds, 5.2 blocks, and 4.6 assists per game, leading Rancho Christian to a 22–8 record. He repeated as California Gatorade Player of the Year, joining Jrue Holiday as the award's only two-time winners. Mobley was named Morgan Wootten National Player of the Year. He was also selected to play in the McDonald's All-American Game, Jordan Brand Classic, and Nike Hoop Summit, but all three games were canceled due to the COVID-19 pandemic.

Recruiting
Mobley was considered a consensus five-star recruit and one of the top three players in the 2020 recruiting class and at one point ahead of Cade Cunningham . On August 5, 2019, he committed to play college basketball for USC over offers from UCLA and Washington, among other major NCAA Division I programs. Mobley became one of the highest-ranked players to join the program.

College career
In his college debut for USC on November 25, 2020, Mobley scored 21 points and had nine rebounds in a 95–87 overtime win against California Baptist. On March 11, 2021, at the Pac-12 tournament quarterfinals, he posted a career-high 26 points, nine rebounds and five blocks in a 91–85 double overtime victory over Utah. In a 72–70 semifinals loss to Colorado, Mobley scored 26 points for a second time, while recording nine rebounds and five blocks. As a freshman, he averaged 16.4 points, 8.7 rebounds, 2.8 blocks and 2.4 assists per game. Mobley was named the Pac-12 Player of the Year, Defensive Player of the Year and Freshman of the Year. He became the second player from a major conference to win the trio of awards, joining Anthony Davis of the Southeastern Conference in 2012. On April 16, 2021, Mobley declared for the 2021 NBA draft, forgoing his remaining college eligibility. Mobley was seen by many as the second best prospect in the 2021 NBA draft behind Cade Cunningham.

Professional career

Cleveland Cavaliers (2021–present)
Mobley was selected third overall in the 2021 NBA draft by the Cleveland Cavaliers. On August 3, 2021, he signed with the Cavaliers. On August 8, 2021, Mobley made his summer league debut in a 84–76 loss against the Houston Rockets where he posted 12 points, five rebounds, and three blocks in 28 minutes. On October 20, he made his NBA debut, putting up 17 points, nine rebounds, and six assists in a 132–121 loss to the Memphis Grizzlies. On November 15, Mobley suffered a sprained right elbow in a 98–92 loss to the Boston Celtics. He was named the NBA Eastern Rookie of the Month for games played in October/November. On December 8, Mobley became the first Cleveland rookie since LeBron James in March 2004 to record five blocks in an NBA game. 

Starting all the 69 games he played, Mobley finished the season averaging 15.0 points, 8.3 rebounds, 2.5 assists, 1.7 blocks, and .8 steals per game, while shooting .508, .250, and .663 from the field, the three-point line, and on free throws, respectively, on 33.8 minutes per game. He led rookies in both rebounds and blocks per game, while ranking fifth for points per game. He was the second best rookie (behind Scottie Barnes of the Toronto Raptors) in win shares (5.2) and value over replacement player (1.5). Alongside All-Star center Jarrett Allen, Mobley led Cleveland from a .306 winning percentage and the league's sixth-worst defense to a .537 winning percentage and the league's fifth best defense for efficiency. Of Mobley, fellow Cavalier Darius Garland told The Ringer's Rob Mahoney: "He does everything for us. Defensive-wise, offensive-wise. He's a 7-foot unicorn." Mobley finished as the runner-up to Scottie Barnes in voting for the NBA Rookie of the Year. The 15-point difference was the smallest voting margin in 19 years since the award's voting format began in 2002–03.

On January 21, 2023, Mobley scored a career-high 38 points on 19-of-27 shooting from the field, along with nine rebounds and three assists in a 114–102 win over the Milwaukee Bucks. He became only the fourth player since 1979, when the 3-point line was adopted, to score at least 38 points without making a free throw or 3-pointer. Hakeem Olajuwon, Alex English (twice) and George Gervin are the others.

National team career
Mobley played for the United States at the 2018 FIBA Under-17 World Cup in Argentina. In seven games, he averaged 9.3 points, 5.6 rebounds and 2.6 assists per game, helping his team win the gold medal. Mobley joined the United States for the 2019 FIBA Under-19 World Cup in Heraklion, Greece, but he was limited to playing two games and a total of seven minutes in the tournament due to back spasms. His team won the gold medal despite his absence.

Career statistics

NBA

Regular season

|-
| style="text-align:left;"|
| style="text-align:left;"|Cleveland
| 69 || 69 || 33.8 || .508 || .250 || .663 || 8.3 || 2.5 || .8 || 1.7 || 15.0
|- class="sortbottom"
| style="text-align:center;" colspan="2"|Career
| 69 || 69 || 33.8 || .508 || .250 || .663 || 8.3 || 2.5 || .8 || 1.7 || 15.0

College

|-
| style="text-align:left;"| 2020–21
| style="text-align:left;"| USC
| style="background:#cfecec;"|33* || style="background:#cfecec;"|33* || 33.9 || .578 || .300 || .694 || 8.7 || 2.4 || .8 || 2.9 || 16.4

Personal life
Mobley's father Eric played college basketball for Cal Poly Pomona and Portland and played professionally in China, Indonesia, Mexico and Portugal. He later coached Amateur Athletic Union (AAU) basketball for 11 years. In 2018, he was hired as assistant basketball coach for USC. Mobley's older brother Isaiah Mobley also played for USC. He entered the 2022 NBA Draft and was selected 49th overall to the Cavaliers, rejoining his brother. His mother, Nicol, is an elementary school teacher. Mobley grew up with three foster siblings, including a Chinese exchange student named Johnny.

References

External links
USC Trojans bio
USA Basketball bio

2001 births
Living people
All-American college men's basketball players
American men's basketball players
Basketball players from San Diego
Centers (basketball)
Cleveland Cavaliers draft picks
Cleveland Cavaliers players
McDonald's High School All-Americans
Power forwards (basketball)
USC Trojans men's basketball players